The Lopota is a river in the far north-eastern part of the Kakheti region in Georgia. It flows through the village Lapanquri, and discharges into the Alazani near Telavi. Its upper reach borders with the Russian North Caucasian Republic of Dagestan and was scene of a Georgian anti-insurgency operation in August 2012.

References 

Valleys of Georgia (country)
Geography of Kakheti
Rivers of Georgia (country)